Olusola Kehinde  is a Nigerian professor of plant breeding and genetics who became the Vice Chancellor of the Federal University of Agriculture, Abeokuta, Ogun state, Nigeria since 2023. He was the Deputy Vice-Chancellor (Development) until his appointment as the Vice-Chancellor.

References 

Living people
Nigerian academic administrators
University of Ibadan alumni
Academic staff of the Federal University of Agriculture, Abeokuta